Maria João Koehler (born 8 October 1992) is a retired Portuguese tennis player.

Koehler has won three singles titles and four doubles titles on the ITF Circuit in her career. On 25 February 2013, she reached her best singles ranking of world No. 102. On 18 June 2012, she peaked at No. 151 in the doubles rankings.

Playing for the Portugal Fed Cup team, Koehler has a win–loss record of 11–20.

Career
Born in Porto, Koehler made her debut on the ITF Women's Circuit at the age of 14 at a $10k event in Braga. Having qualified for the main draw, she lost her first match to Catarina Ferreira.

She made her WTA Tour main-draw debut at the 2009 Estoril Open. Having been awarded a wildcard, she played world No. 77, Kristina Barrois, in the first round, losing in straight sets.

Grand Slam singles performance timeline

ITF Circuit finals

Singles: 12 (4 titles, 8 runner-ups)

Doubles: 8 (4 titles, 4 runner-ups)

Notes

References

External links

 
 
 

1992 births
Living people
Sportspeople from Porto
Portuguese female tennis players
Portuguese people of German descent
21st-century Portuguese women